Heylor is a settlement situated on the south side of Ronas Voe in Northmavine, Shetland, Scotland. It lies directly opposite Ronas Hill, Shetland's tallest mountain.

Etymology 
The name Heylor comes from the Old Norse hellir meaning cave or cavern, of which there are several (most only accessible by sea) on the west side of Ronas Voe.

History 
One of the earliest mentions of Heylor could be in a document describing the division of Hans Sigurdson's property in 1490, by which it is referred to as Heleland. Heylor also appears in a 1545 document confirming an agreement in an older 1516 document stipulating the transfer of land between Udal landowners. Heelle is believed to refer to Heylor.

There used to be a post office in Heylor, which gives rise to the fact that many residences several miles away from Heylor still retain Heylor in their postal addresses.

Notes

References

Sources 

 
 
 

Villages in Mainland, Shetland
Northmavine